Charles I d'Amboise (1430 - 22 February 1481) was a French politician and military figure, a member of the House of Amboise.
He was lord of Chaumont-sur-Loire, Sagonne, Meillant, Charenton-du-Cher. Louis XI appointed him governor of Île-de-France, Champagne and Burgundy. He was admitted to the order of Saint Michael.

Family
He was the oldest son of Pierre d'Amboise. He had six children with his wife Catherine de Chauvigny (1447-1485).

 François
 Charles II d'Amboise (1473 - 1511)
 Louis II d'Amboise
 Guy
 Marie, married to Robert II of Saarbrücken-Commercy(† 1504), who was Count of Roucy, and had issue.
 Catherine d'Amboise (1482 - 1549)

References 

1430 births
1481 deaths
Charles
Military governors of Paris